Death Valley is a desert valley in Eastern California, in the northern Mojave Desert, bordering the Great Basin Desert. During summer, it is thought to be the hottest place on Earth. Death Valley is home to the Timbisha tribe of Native Americans, formerly known as the Panamint Shoshone, who have inhabited the valley for at least the past millennium. 

On the afternoon of July10, 1913, the United States Weather Bureau recorded a high temperature of 134 °F (56.7 °C) at Furnace Creek in Death Valley, which stands as the highest ambient air temperature ever recorded on the surface of the Earth. This reading, however, and several others taken in that period are disputed by some modern experts.

Lying mostly in Inyo County, California, near the border of California and Nevada, in the Great Basin, east of the Sierra Nevada mountains, Death Valley constitutes much of Death Valley National Park and is the principal feature of the Mojave and Colorado Deserts Biosphere Reserve. It runs from north to south between the Amargosa Range on the east and the Panamint Range on the west. The Grapevine Mountains and the Owlshead Mountains form its northern and southern boundaries, respectively.

Geology

Death Valley is a graben—a downdropped block of land between two mountain ranges. It lies at the southern end of a geological trough, Walker Lane, which runs north to Oregon. The valley is bisected by a right lateral strike slip fault system, comprising the Death Valley Fault and the Furnace Creek Fault. The eastern end of the left lateral Garlock Fault intersects the Death Valley Fault. Furnace Creek and the Amargosa River flow through part of the valley and eventually disappear into the sands of the valley floor.

Death Valley also contains salt pans. According to current geological consensus, at various times during the middle of the Pleistocene era, which ended roughly 10,000–12,000 years ago, an inland lake, Lake Manly, formed in Death Valley. The end-basin in a chain of lakes that began with Mono Lake, in the north, and continued through basins down the Owens River Valley, through Searles and China Lakes and the Panamint Valley, to the immediate west.

As the area turned to desert, the water evaporated, leaving an abundance of evaporitic salts, such as common sodium salts and borax, which were later exploited during the modern history of the region, primarily 1883 to 1907.

Climate
Death Valley has a subtropical, hot desert climate (Köppen: BWh), with long, extremely hot summers; short, warm winters; and little rainfall.

The valley is extremely dry, because it lies in the rain shadow of four major mountain ranges (including the Sierra Nevada and Panamint Range). Moisture moving inland from the Pacific Ocean must pass eastward over the mountains to reach Death Valley; as air masses are forced upward by each range, they cool and moisture condenses, to fall as rain or snow on the western slopes. When the air masses reach Death Valley, most of the moisture in the air has already been lost and thus there is little left to fall as precipitation.

The extreme heat of Death Valley is attributable to a confluence of geographic and topographic factors. Scientists have identified a number of key contributors:

 Solar heating: The valley's surface (consisting of soil, rocks, sand, etc.) undergoes intense solar heating because the air is clear and dry, and the land is dark and sparsely vegetated. This is especially noticeable in mid-summer, when the sun is nearly directly overhead.
 Trapping of warm air: Warm air naturally rises and cools; in Death Valley this air is subject to continual reheating as it is trapped by high, steep valley walls and recycled back to the valley floor. Warm air also is trapped by the valley's north–south orientation, which runs perpendicular to prevailing west-to-east winds.
 Migration of warm air from other areas (advection): Warm desert regions adjacent to Death Valley, especially to the south and east, often heat air before it arrives in Death Valley.
 Warm mountain winds: As winds are forced up and over mountains (e.g. the numerous ranges west of Death Valley), the winds can be warmed in several ways. The resulting dry, warm winds are known as foehn winds. Their warmth can in part be caused by the release of latent heat, which occurs when water vapor condenses into clouds.

Severe heat and dryness contribute to perpetual drought-like conditions in Death Valley and prevent much cloud formation from passing through the confines of the valley, where precipitation is often in the form of a virga.

The depth and shape of Death Valley strongly influence its climate. The valley is a long, narrow basin that descends below sea level and is walled by high, steep mountain ranges. The clear, dry air and sparse plant cover allow sunlight to heat the desert surface. Summer nights provide little relief: overnight lows may dip just into the  range. Moving masses of super-heated air blow through the valley, creating extremely high ambient temperatures.

During the heat wave that peaked with that record, five consecutive days reached  or higher. Some modern meteorologists now dispute the accuracy of the 1913 temperature measurement. The valley again recorded that temperature on July 9, 2021.

The greatest number of consecutive days with a maximum temperature of at least  was 154, in the summer of 2001. The summer of 1917 had 52 days when the temperature reached  or above, 43 of them consecutive.

This is one of the highest values ever recorded.

Four major mountain ranges lie between Death Valley and the ocean, each one adding to an increasingly drier rain shadow effect, and in 1929, 1953, and 1989, no rain was recorded for the whole year. The period from 1931 to 1934 was the driest stretch on record, with only  of rain over a 40-month period.
The wettest month on record is January 1995, when  fell on Death Valley. Snow with accumulation has only been recorded in January 1922, while scattered flakes have been recorded on other occasions.

Flooding

As it has done before for hundreds of years, the lowest spot in the valley filled with a wide, shallow lake, but the extreme heat and aridity immediately began evaporating the ephemeral lake.

The pair of images (seen at right) from NASA's Landsat 5 satellite documents the short history of Death Valley's Lake Badwater: formed in February 2005 (top) and evaporated by February 2007 (bottom). In 2005, a big pool of greenish water stretched most of the way across the valley floor. By May 2005, the valley floor had resumed its more familiar role as Badwater Basin, salt-coated salt flats. In time, this freshly dissolved and recrystallized salt will darken.

The western margin of Death Valley is traced by alluvial fans. During flash floods, rainfall from the steep mountains to the west pours through narrow canyons, picking up everything from fine clay to large rocks. When these torrents reach the mouths of the canyons, they widen and slow, branching out into distributary channels. The paler the fans, the younger they are.

Ecology

In spite of the overwhelming heat and sparse rainfall, Death Valley exhibits considerable biodiversity. Flowers, watered by snowmelt, carpet the desert floor each spring, continuing into June. Bighorn sheep, red-tailed hawks, and wild donkeys may be seen. Death Valley has over 600 springs and ponds. Salt Creek, a mile-long shallow depression in the center of the valley, supports Death Valley Pupfish. These isolated pupfish populations are remnants of the wetter Pleistocene climate.

Darwin Falls, on the western edge of Death Valley Monument, falls  into a large pond surrounded by willows and cottonwood trees. Over 80 species of birds have been recorded around the pond.

Efflorescence, also known as salt flowers, is a rare occurrence in Death Valley that occurs when rain soaks into the soil and dissolves salt beneath the surface causing the ground to appear as if there is a light dusting of snow.

History
Death Valley is home to the Timbisha tribe of Native Americans, formerly known as the Panamint Shoshone, who have inhabited the valley for at least the past millennium. The Timbisha name for the valley, tümpisa, means "rock paint" and refers to the red ocher paint that can be made from a type of clay found in the valley. Some families still live in the valley at Furnace Creek. Another village was in Grapevine Canyon near the present site of Scotty's Castle. It was called maahunu in the Timbisha language, whose meaning is uncertain, although it is known that hunu means 'canyon'.

The valley received its English name in 1849 during the California Gold Rush. It was called Death Valley by prospectors and others who sought to cross the valley on their way to the gold fields, after 13 pioneers perished from one early expedition of wagon trains. During the 1850s, gold and silver were extracted in the valley. In the 1880s, borax was discovered and extracted by mule-drawn wagons.

Death Valley National Monument was proclaimed on February 11, 1933, by President Herbert Hoover, placing the area under federal protection. In 1994, the monument was redesignated as Death Valley National Park, as well as being substantially expanded to include Saline and Eureka Valleys.

Notable attractions and locations

 Badwater Basin
 China Ranch
 Dante's View
 Darwin Falls
 Devils Hole
 Father Crowley Viewpoint
 Furnace Creek
 Harmony Borax Works
 Hells Gate
 Myers Ranch
 Oasis at Death Valley
 Russell Camp
 New Ryan
 Upper and Lower Noonday Camp
 Racetrack Playa, a large dry lakebed within the Valley
 Sailing stones, famous moving stones of Death Valley
 Scotty's Castle
 Shoreline Butte
 Stovepipe Wells
 Tecopa
 Tecopa Hot Springs
 West Side Borax Camp
 Wilson Ranch
 Wildrose Ranger Station
 Zabriskie Point

In popular culture

Films
A number of movies have been filmed in Death Valley, including:

 Chimmie Fadden Out West (1915)
 The Dawn of Understanding (1918)
 Greed (1924)
 The Air Mail (1925)
 The Brute (1927)
 The Chinese Parrot (1927)
 Fair Warning (1931)
 The Border Patrolman (1936)
 Danger Valley (1937)
 20 Mule Team (1940)
 The Bride Came C.O.D. (1941)
 Castle in the Desert (1942)
 Accomplice (1946)
 Death Valley (1946)
 3 Godfathers (1948)
 Yellow Sky (1948)
 Death Valley Gunfighter (1949)
 The Walking Hills (1949)
 Surrender (1950)
 The Gunfighter (1950)
 Cattle Drive (1951)
 Westward the Women (1951)
 City of Bad Men (1953)
 Escape from Fort Bravo (1953)
 Tumbleweed (1953)
 War Paint (1953)
 The Law and Jake Wade (1958)
 One-Eyed Jacks (1961)
 The Reward (1965)
 The Professionals (1966)
 Zabriskie Point (1970)
 Star Wars (1977)
 Death Valley (1982)
 Cherry 2000 (1987)
 Phantasm IV: Oblivion (1998)
 Six-String Samurai (1998)
 Gerry (2002)
 Daft Punk's Electroma (2006)
 The Legend of God's Gun (2007)
 Planes: Fire & Rescue (2014)

Music
Death Valley Suite (1949), a symphonic suite by Ferde Grofé, inspired by the history and geography of Death Valley
"Death Valley" (2013), a song from the studio album Save Rock and Roll by Fall Out Boy, is named after Death Valley, as well as containing lyrics inspired by this location
"Death Valley '69" (1984), a song by Sonic Youth and Lydia Lunch, is about the valley, and the video features imagery of it.
"Death Valley Nights" (1977), a song from the studio album Spectres by Blue Öyster Cult, takes place in the valley, using the extreme climate to mirror a dramatic love/hate relationship.
"Canyon Moon" (2014), a song by Andrew McMahon in the Wilderness, contains lyrics about driving through Death Valley.

Television
Death Valley (TV series), a 2011 MTV horror comedy series
Death Valley Days (1930–1945 radio series; 1952–1970 TV series), an American radio and television anthology series featuring true stories of the old American West, particularly the Death Valley area.
 Retired wrestler and WWF/E legend The Undertaker is billed from Death Valley.
 The FX horror anthology series American Horror Story has a tenth season titled American Horror Story: Double Feature, which is split into two parts.  While the first part, Red Tide, takes place by the sea, the second part of the season, Death Valley, focuses on a group of teens uncovering a conspiracy involving Dwight D. Eisenhower and strange occurrences in a desert partially inspired by Death Valley involving aliens and UFOs.

See also 

List of weather records
Henry Wade Exit Route

Notes

References

External links

 Official Death Valley National Park website—National Park Service
 Historical photographs of Death Valley (1926), The Bancroft Library
 UNESCO Biosphere Preserve: Mojave and Colorado Deserts
 Strange moving rocks of the valley 
 Death Valley Area Interactive Map
 Surficial Geologic Map of the Death Valley Junction 30′ × 60′ Quadrangle, California and Nevada United States Geological Survey
 Death Valley Weather
 
 Death Valley Nonprofit Support Organization
 Death Valley  on National Geographic
 

 

Bodies of water of Inyo County, California
Bodies of water of San Bernardino County, California
Extreme points of Earth
Lowest points of U.S. states
Regions of California
Rifts and grabens
Springs of California
Torridness
Valleys of California
Valleys of Inyo County, California
Valleys of San Bernardino County, California
Valleys of the Mojave Desert
Weather extremes of Earth